Nelsonite is an igneous rock primarily constituted of ilmenite and apatite, with anatase, chlorite, phosphosiderite, talc and/or wavellite appearing as minor components. Rocks are equigranular with a grain size around 2 - 3 mm. The black ilmenite is slightly magnetic while the whitish apatite is not.

Name
It was named for Nelson County, Virginia, and is also found in that state's Amherst and Roanoke counties. In 2016, the Virginia legislature designated it as the official State Rock of Virginia.

Use
At one time, it was mined for the primary extraction of titanium dioxide. Titanium dioxide from ilmenite is used as a white paint pigments and in the early 1900's as a colorant of artificial teeth. The calcium phosphate from apatite is used as agricultural fertilizer. While no active mining of Nelsonite occurs in Virginia, active mining occurs in parts of China for rare-earth elements.

Formation
Anorthosite-related nelsonite occurs mainly as veins and lensoidal intrusions in anorthosite complex or wall rocks. The Fe–Ti–P-rich magma liquids formed immiscible and eutectic mixtures crystallizing around 850-1,000 °C followed by intense fractionation.
Disagreement exists on the role liquid immiscibility plays in generating nelsonite and Fe–Ti oxides ore. It is not common to have such relatively large density differentials of mineral constituents as seen in Nelsonite; ilmenite (4.7–5.2 g/cm3)  and apatite (~ 3.5 g/cm3). Nelsonites experience differential weathering. Exposed apatite within the Nelsonite is readily removed through solution by meteoric waters that can result in a cellular or sponge-like ilmenite mass.

Occurrence
Nelsonites are generally associated with anorthosite intrusions and scarce worldwide.
 Nelsonite occurs at various localities, not limited to: Nelson, Amhurst, & Roanoke Counties, Va.; Carthage & Cheney Pond, N.Y.; Laramie, W.Va.; Washington State; Quebec, Canada; and China.

Roseland-Piney River district, Virginia
The nelsonite occurs in alkalic Roseland anorthosite, and in gneiss, granulite, and charnockitic rocks surrounding the anorthosite. Multiple varieties of equigranular nelsonite are present in the Roseland-Piney River district.
 Ilmenite nelsonite: the most abundant variety, commonly occurs in marginal parts of the anorthosite and in surrounding rocks near the anorthosite contact.
 rutile nelsonite: occurs only within the anorthosite.
 magnetite and biotite nelsonite: limited to the rocks surrounding the Roseland anorthosite.
 hornblende nelsonite
 gabbro-nelsonite: a rock intermediate in composition between gabbro and nelsonite
The prefixes ilmenite, rutile, magnetite, biotite, and hornblende denote special richness of the rocks in these minerals.

References

Igneous rocks
Symbols of Virginia
Nelson County, Virginia